Rear-Admiral Basil Beaumont (1669–1703) was a senior Royal Navy officer who was the fifth son, amongst the twenty-one children, of Sir Henry Beaumont, 2nd Baronet, of Stoughton Grange and Cole Orton.

Naval career
Of his early service in the navy there is no record: it was short and uneventful, and on 28 October 1688 he was appointed lieutenant of the Portsmouth. Although so young a captain, no blame attached to him. He continued in the Rupert during the following year; and in 1694 commanded  in the Mediterranean. In 1696 he commanded , in the fleet cruising in the English Channel and off Ushant, and was for a short time detached as commodore of an inshore squadron. In the end of August he was ordered to pay the ship off. He commissioned her again some months later, and continued in her for the next two years, for a great part of which time he lay in the Downs, commanding – as he wrote – "a number of ships of consequence, with no small trouble and a good deal of charge", on which he referred it to the lord high admiral, "if this does not require more than barely commanding as the eldest captain" (9 April 1702).

His application did not meet with immediate success; in June he was turned over to the Tilbury, and continued to command the squadron in the Downs, at the Nore, and in the North Sea, till, on 1 March 1702–3, he was promoted to rear-admiral, and directed to hoist his flag on board , then fitting out at Woolwich. His rank, not his service, was altered. During the summer he cruised in the North Sea and off Dunkirk, or convoyed the Baltic trade; on the approach of winter he returned to the Downs, where he anchored on 19 October. He was still there on 27 November, when the great storm (Great Storm of 1703) which "o'er pale Britannia passed", hurled the ship on to the Goodwin Sands. Every soul on board, the admiral included, was lost. The circumstances of his death have given to Beaumont's name a wider repute than his career as an officer would have otherwise entitled it to; his service throughout was creditable, without being distinguished; and the only remarkable point about it is that, after having held important commands, he attained flag-rank within fifteen years of his entry into the service, and when he was not yet thirty-four years of age.

Family and legacy
Two younger brothers, who had also entered the navy, had previously died; one, William Villiers, a lieutenant, had died of fever in the West Indies, 17 July 1697; the other, Charles, was lost in the blowing up of the Carlisle, 19 September 1700; and their mother, Lady Beaumont, after the death of the rear-admiral, memorialised the queen, praying for relief. As Lady Beaumont's second son, George, who, on the death of his elder brother, had succeeded to the title and estates, was unmarried and appointed a lord commissioner of the admiralty in 1714, the implied statement that the family was dependent on Basil is curious. The petition, however, was successful, and a pension of  £50 a year was granted to each of the six daughters.

Beaumont's portrait, by Michael Dahl, is in the Painted Hall at Greenwich, to which it was presented by King George IV; it is that of a comely young man.

References

DNB references
These references are found in the DNB article referred to above.

External links
 

1669 births
1703 deaths
English admirals
17th-century Royal Navy personnel
18th-century Royal Navy personnel
Deaths due to shipwreck at sea
British naval commanders in the War of the Spanish Succession